The African Renaissance Monument is a  tall bronze statue located on top of one of the twin hills known as Collines des Mamelles, outside Dakar, Senegal. Built overlooking the Atlantic Ocean in the Ouakam suburb, the statue was designed by the Senegalese architect Pierre Goudiaby after an idea presented by president Abdoulaye Wade and built by Mansudae Overseas Projects, a company from North Korea. 

Site preparation on top of the 100-meter high hill began in 2006, and construction of the bronze statue began  2008. Originally scheduled for completion in December 2009, delays stretched into early 2010, and the formal dedication occurred on 4 April 2010, Senegal's "National Day", commemorating the 50th anniversary of the country's independence from France. It is the tallest statue in Africa.

Construction

The project was launched by then Senegalese president Abdoulaye Wade who considered it part of Senegal's prestige projects, aimed at providing monuments to herald a new era of African Renaissance. It shows a family drawn up towards the sky, the man carrying his child on his biceps and holding his wife by the waist, "an Africa emerging from the bowels of the earth, leaving obscurantism to go towards the light". The monument indeed represents an African family resolutely turned towards the North-West. The project of the monument was entrusted to the Senegalese architect Pierre Goudiaby Atepa, author "in particular" of the Door of the Third Millennium which overhangs the road of the Corniche. The work was "drawn" by President Wade who owns 35% of the copyright, but the work was initiated by the famous Senegalese artist Ousmane Sow who has since withdrawn from the project following a disagreement with Abdoulaye Wade.

Unveiling
On 3 April 2010, the African Renaissance Monument was unveiled in Dakar in front of 19 African heads of state, including President of Malawi and the African Union, Bingu wa Mutharika, Jean Ping of the African Union Commission and the Presidents of Benin, Cape Verde, Republic of the Congo, Ivory Coast, The Gambia, Liberia, Mali, Mauritania and Zimbabwe, as well as representatives from North Korea, and Jesse Jackson and musician Akon, both from the United States, all of whom were given a tour.

President Wade said, "It brings to life our common destiny. Africa has arrived in the 21st century standing tall and more ready than ever to take its destiny into its hands." President Bingu said, "This monument does not belong to Senegal. It belongs to the African people wherever we are."

Controversies

Expense
Thousands of people protested against "all the failures of President Wade's regime, the least of which is this horrible statue" on the city's streets beforehand, with riot police deployed to maintain control. Deputy leader of the opposition Ndeye Fatou Toure described the monument as an "economic monster and a financial scandal in the context of the current [economic] crisis".

The colossal statue has been criticized for its cost at US$ 27 million (£16.6m). The payment was made in kind, with 30 to 40 hectares of land that has variously been reported as sponsored  by a Senegalese businessman or state-owned land.

Style
The statue was built by Mansudae Overseas Projects, a North Korean sculpting company famous for various projects and large statues throughout Africa since the 1970s. 

The statue was poorly received by art critics around the world after its much-delayed unveiling in 2010 and was compared by some to the (once-abandoned) Christopher Columbus statue project that was unveiled in Arecibo, Puerto Rico in 2016. Local imams argued that a statue depicting a human figure is idolatrous and objected to the perceived immodesty of the semi-nude male and female figures.

Revenue
The project has also attracted controversy due to Wade's claim to the intellectual property rights of the statue, and insisting that he is entitled to 35 percent of the profits raised. Opposition figures have sharply criticised Wade's plan to claim intellectual property rights, insisting that the president cannot claim copyright over ideas conceived as a function of his public office.

Local artists
Ousmane Sow, a world-renowned Senegalese sculptor, also objected to the use of foreign builders, saying it was anything but a symbol of African Renaissance and nothing to do with art.

Gallery of images

See also

African Renaissance
Mansudae Overseas Projects
List of tallest statues
Sungbo's Eredo

References

National monuments and memorials
Buildings and structures in Dakar
Buildings and structures completed in 2010
Mansudae Overseas Projects
Colossal statues
Black people in art
Sculptures of children